Gastone Simoni (9 April 1937 – 28 August 2022) was an Italian prelate of the Catholic Church serving as the bishop of Diocese of Prato from 1992 to 2021.

Biography

Simoni was born in Castelfranco di Sopra, in the province of Arezzo, Italy on 9 April 1937. He studied theology at Small Diocesan Seminary of Strada in Casentino and the Seminary of Fiesole. He was ordained to the priesthood in 1960 by the bishop of Fiesole, Antonio Bagnoli.

As a priest, Simoni served as provicar general (1969–1975) and vicar general (1975–1991) for the diocese of Fiesole. He was also rector of the diocesan seminary (1970–1978).

On 7 December 1991 Pope John Paul II appointed Simoni as bishop of the Diocese of Prato, Italy. In January 1992 Simoni was consecrated as a bishop in St. Peter's Basilica by Pope John Paul II. He served as bishop of Prato until his retirement in 2012, after which he became a bishop emeritus.

Simoni died on 28 August 2022. The funeral Mass for Simoni was celebrated at the Prato Cathedral on 31 August.

References

External links 
 
 Message Of The Holy Father To The Bishop of Prato On The Occasion Of The 350th Anniversary Of The Foundation Of The Diocese (21 September 2003) 

1937 births
2022 deaths
Italian Roman Catholic bishops
Bishops appointed by Pope John Paul II
People from the Province of Prato